Brussels Boulevard is a boulevard in district of Iskar, east Sofia. The boulevard connects Sofia Airport with Tsarigradsko shose.

Streets in Sofia